Burton Bradstock is a village and civil parish in Dorset, England, approximately  southeast of Bridport and  inland from the English Channel at Chesil Beach. In the 2011 Census the parish had a population of 948. The village lies in the Bride Valley, close to the mouth of the small River Bride. It comprises 16th- and 17th-century thatched cottages, a parish church (dedicated to St Mary the Virgin), two pubs, a primary school, shop, post office stores, beach café, hotel, garage, village hall, reading room a library. The parish has a National Coastwatch Institution Station, Lyme Bay Station.

History
The place was first recorded in the Domesday Book of 1086 as Bridetone, it had 28 households and the lord of the manor was the Abbey of Saint-Wandrille.  The toponym means the place (Old English tūn) on the River Bride, and therefore has a different origin from most places named "Burton", including Burton, Dorset.  

In 1286 land in the village was acquired by Bradenstoke Priory in Wiltshire.  Bradenstoke, sometimes pronounced Bradstock, gave its name to the suffix "Bradstock".

The cliffs were used for training before the Normandy landings in 1943.

Geography

Near the top of these cliffs is a layer of Inferior Oolite, which contains large ammonites. Rockfalls result in these being accessible to fossil hunters on the beach beneath. At Hive Beach there is a gap in the cliffs; the National Trust owns the land here and provide a car park. There is a yearly Spring Tide Festival on the beach.

Governance
The village is within the Dorset Council ward of Chesil Bank and the parliamentary constituency of West Dorset.  The MP since 2019, is Chris Loder (Conservative Party).

Transport
The village has a frequent local bus service to Bridport via West Bay, and is also served by the X53 coastal bus service which runs east to Weymouth, Wareham and Poole and west to Bridport, Lyme Regis, Seaton and Exeter. The village has several local footpaths including one to the beach and the coastpath to West Bay.

Famous residents
The musician Billy Bragg has lived in the village since 2000.

References

External links 

Burton Bradstock Village Website 
Photos of Burton Bradstock

Villages in Dorset
Populated coastal places in Dorset
Jurassic Coast